Clear cell acanthoma (also known as Acanthome cellules claires of Degos and Civatte, Degos acanthoma, and Pale cell acanthoma) is a benign clinical and histological lesion initially described as neoplastic, which some authors now regard as a reactive dermatosis. It usually presents as a moist solitary firm, brown-red, well-circumscribed, 5 mm to 2 cm nodule or plaque on the lower extremities of middle-aged to elderly individuals. The lesion has a crusted, scaly peripheral collarette and vascular puncta on the surface. It is characterized by slow growth, and may persist for years. The clinical differential diagnosis includes: dermatofibroma, inflamed seborrheic keratosis, pyogenic granuloma, basal-cell carcinoma, squamous cell carcinoma, verruca vulgaris, psoriatic plaque, and melanoma.

Histology
Clear cell acanthoma is characterized by a sharply demarcated psoriasiform epidermal hyperplasia composed of a proliferation of slightly enlarged keratinocytes, and basal cells with pale-staining glycogen-rich cytoplasm, mild spongiosis and scattered neutrophils, which may form small intraepidermal microabscesses. Oedematous dermal papillae are typically seen with increased vascularity and a mixed inflammatory infiltrate including lymphocytes, plasma cells and neutrophils.

Treatment
Simple surgical excision is curative.

See also
 Epidermis
List of cutaneous conditions
 List of cutaneous neoplasms associated with systemic syndromes

References

Epidermal nevi, neoplasms, and cysts